Andrea Gómez (born April 13, 1985, in Mérida, Venezuela), is a pageant titleholder. She is the Miss Venezuela International titleholder for 2004, and was the official representative of Venezuela to the Miss International 2005 pageant held in Tokyo, Japan, on September 26, 2005, when she classified in the Top semifinalists.

Gómez competed in the national beauty pageant Miss Venezuela 2004 and obtained the title of Miss Venezuela International. She represented the Distrito Capital.

Career
When Andrea was 14 years old, she enrolled in modeling classes at John Casablancas Modeling and Career Center, and then began modeling for designers Versace, Armani, Angel Sanchez, Samy Gicherman, Gabriela Arango,  Franco Montoro at age 15.
In 2004 Gomez was the face for magazines such as Glamour, Vogue, Buen Hogar, Vanidades, and became one of the most popular women in her country.

On July, 2007 Gomez started working in the corporate world joining VeriFone a company that makes point-of-sale equipment, becoming a successful business woman as a General Manager for Caribbean, Central America, and Andean region.

Personal life
In October 2011 she married Ecuadorian tennis player Giovanni Lapentti. In March 2012 the couple had a baby girl, Giuliana Lapentti Gomez.

References

External links
Miss Venezuela Official Website
Miss International Official Website

1985 births
Living people
People from Mérida, Mérida
Miss Venezuela International winners
Miss International 2005 delegates